Kirovsky (masculine), Kirovskaya (feminine), or Kirovskoye (neuter) may refer to:
Kirovsky District, several districts in the countries of the former Soviet Union
Kirovsky Urban Settlement (or Kirovskoye Urban Settlement), several municipal urban settlements in Russia
Kirovsky, Russia (Kirovskaya, Kirovskoye), several inhabited localities in Russia
Kirovskiy, former name of Xırdalan, Azerbaijan
Kirovskiy, former name of Kirov, Baku, Azerbaijan
Kirovskiy, former name of Balpyk Bi, Kazakhstan
Kirov Oblast (Kirovskaya oblast), a federal subject of Russia
Kirovskaya metro station, several metro stations in Russia
Kirovskaya railway station, closed railway stations in St. Peterburg, Russia
Kirovske (Kirovskoye), an air base in Crimea

See also
Kirovski, Macedonian last name
Kirov (disambiguation)
Kirovsk (disambiguation)
Kirovske (disambiguation)
Kirovka (disambiguation)